In computer science, augmented Backus–Naur form (ABNF) is a metalanguage based on Backus–Naur form (BNF), but consisting of its own syntax and derivation rules. The motive principle for ABNF is to describe a formal system of a language to be used as a bidirectional communications protocol.

 supersedes .  updates it, adding a syntax for specifying case-sensitive string literals.

Overview

An ABNF specification is a set of derivation rules, written as

 rule = definition ; comment CR LF

where rule is a case-insensitive nonterminal, the definition consists of sequences of symbols that define the rule, a comment for documentation, and ending with a carriage return and line feed.

Rule names are case-insensitive: <rulename>, <Rulename>, <RULENAME>, and <rUlENamE> all refer to the same rule. Rule names consist of a letter followed by letters, numbers, and hyphens.

Angle brackets (<, >) are not required around rule names (as they are in BNF). However, they may be used to delimit a rule name when used in prose to discern a rule name.

Terminal values

Terminals are specified by one or more numeric characters.

For example, a carriage return is specified by %d13 in decimal or %x0D in hexadecimal. A carriage return followed by a line feed may be specified with concatenation as %d13.10.

Literal text is specified through the use of a string enclosed in quotation marks ("). These strings are case-insensitive, and the character set used is (US-)ASCII. Therefore, the string "abc" will match “abc”, “Abc”, “aBc”, “abC”, “ABc”, “AbC”, “aBC”, and “ABC”. RFC 7405 added a syntax for case-sensitive strings: %s"aBc" will only match "aBc". Prior to that, a case-sensitive string could only be specified by listing the individual characters: to match “aBc”, the definition would be %d97.66.99. A string can also be explicitly specified as case-insensitive with a %i prefix.

Operators

White space
White space is used to separate elements of a definition; for space to be recognized as a delimiter, it must be explicitly included. The explicit reference for a single whitespace character is WSP (linear white space), and LWSP is for zero or more whitespace characters with newlines permitted. The LWSP definition in RFC5234 is controversial because at least one whitespace character is needed to form a delimiter between two fields.

Definitions are left-aligned. When multiple lines are required (for readability), continuation lines are indented by whitespace.

Comment
; comment

A semicolon starts a comment that continues to the end of the line.

Concatenation
Rule1 Rule2

A rule may be defined by listing a sequence of rule names.

To match the string “aba”, the following rules could be used:

Alternative
Rule1 / Rule2

A rule may be defined by a list of alternative rules separated by a solidus (/).

To accept the rule fu or the rule bar, the following rule could be constructed:

Incremental alternatives
Rule1 =/ Rule2

Additional alternatives may be added to a rule through the use of =/ between the rule name and the definition.

The rule
 
 
 
is therefore equivalent to

Value range
%c##-##

A range of numeric values may be specified through the use of a hyphen (-).

The rule
 
is equivalent to

Sequence group
(Rule1 Rule2)

Elements may be placed in parentheses to group rules in a definition.

To match "a b d" or "a c d", the following rule could be constructed:
 

To match “a b” or “c d”, the following rules could be constructed:

Variable repetition
n*nRule

To indicate repetition of an element, the form <a>*<b>element is used. The optional <a> gives the minimal number of elements to be included (with the default of 0). The optional <b> gives the maximal number of elements to be included (with the default of infinity).

Use *element for zero or more elements, *1element for zero or one element, 1*element for one or more elements, and 2*3element for two or three elements, cf. regular expressions e*, e?, e+ and e{2,3}.

Specific repetition
nRule

To indicate an explicit number of elements, the form <a>element is used and is equivalent to <a>*<a>element.

Use 2DIGIT to get two numeric digits, and 3DIGIT to get three numeric digits. (DIGIT is defined below under "Core rules". Also see zip-code in the example below.)

Optional sequence
[Rule]

To indicate an optional element, the following constructions are equivalent:

Operator precedence
The following operators have the given precedence from tightest binding to loosest binding:
Strings, names formation
Comment
Value range
Repetition
Grouping, optional
Concatenation
Alternative

Use of the alternative operator with concatenation may be confusing, and it is recommended that grouping be used to make explicit concatenation groups.

Core rules

The core rules are defined in the ABNF standard.

Note that in the core rules diagram the CHAR2 charset is inlined in char-val and CHAR3 is inlined in prose-val in the RFC spec. They are named here for clarity in the main syntax diagram.

Example
The (U.S.) postal address example given in the augmented Backus–Naur form (ABNF) page may be specified as follows:
postal-address   = name-part street zip-part

name-part        = *(personal-part SP) last-name [SP suffix] CRLF
name-part        =/ personal-part CRLF

personal-part    = first-name / (initial ".")
first-name       = *ALPHA
initial          = ALPHA
last-name        = *ALPHA
suffix           = ("Jr." / "Sr." / 1*("I" / "V" / "X"))

street           = [apt SP] house-num SP street-name CRLF
apt              = 1*4DIGIT
house-num        = 1*8(DIGIT / ALPHA)
street-name      = 1*VCHAR

zip-part         = town-name "," SP state 1*2SP zip-code CRLF
town-name        = 1*(ALPHA / SP)
state            = 2ALPHA
zip-code         = 5DIGIT ["-" 4DIGIT]

Pitfalls

RFC 5234 adds a warning in conjunction to the definition of LWSP as follows:

References

Formal languages
Metalanguages